Andrew Robert Fowell Buxton CMG (born 1939) was CEO of Barclays Bank from 1992–93 and chairman from 1993-99.

Early life
Andrew Robert Fowell Buxton was born in 1939. His father was Captain Joseph Gurney Fowell Buxton (1913-1943). He is a descendant of Sir Fowell Buxton, 1st Baronet.

He was educated at Winchester College. He graduated from the University of Oxford. He did his national service with the Grenadier Guards.

Career
In 1993, he succeeded Sir John Quinton as chairman of Barclays Bank. He served as Chairman until 1999.

References

1939 births
Living people
People educated at Winchester College
Alumni of Pembroke College, Oxford
English bankers
Barclays people
British chairpersons of corporations
British chief executives
Andrew
Chairmen of Barclays
Companions of the Order of St Michael and St George